Terje Trei (born 1 May 1967 in Põltsamaa, Jõgeva County) is an Estonian politician. She has been member of the XI, XII and XIII Riigikogu.

In 2000 she graduated from Estonian Entrepreneurship University of Applied Sciences in business and marketing management.

Since 2002 she has been a member of Estonian Reform Party.

References

Living people
1967 births
Estonian Reform Party politicians
Women members of the Riigikogu
Members of the Riigikogu, 2007–2011
Members of the Riigikogu, 2011–2015
Members of the Riigikogu, 2015–2019
People from Põltsamaa
21st-century Estonian women politicians